David Wroblewski (born 1959) is an American novelist whose first novel was The Story of Edgar Sawtelle.

Early life
David Wroblewski was born in Oconomowoc, Wisconsin, near Milwaukee. He earned his master's degree from the Warren Wilson College MFA Program for Writers. As a child and through high school, he had a dog named Prince that was the basis for the dog in his novel.

Career
David Wroblewski started his career in the software industry before becoming a writer.

Personal life
David Wroblewski is married to writer Kimberly McClintock.

References

External links
 Bio
 

1959 births
21st-century American novelists
American male novelists
Living people
People from Oconomowoc, Wisconsin
Novelists from Wisconsin
Warren Wilson College alumni
21st-century American male writers